The Locomotoras Albacete was a steam locomotive manufacturing company established in the 19th century in the Albacete, Spain. It is best known for its football team, Locomotoras Albacete Balón-Pie, who played a pivotal pioneering role in the amateur beginnings of football in Albacete, organizing the first known football match in the city in 1896 and being the predecessor of the latter Albacete Balompié. Thus, like in Swindon, football in Albacete is originally linked to the railway industry.

History
The company manufactured Mikado locomotives in what is now the Zamora street. The company was founded with capital from the Goicoechea family, owners of Talgo, and the British Lancashire and Yorkshire Railway. In 1893, the company opened a new factory in Albacete, with John Hulse, an English industrial engineer of the Lancashire and Yorkshire Railways Company, being the one in charge of laying the foundations for the manufacture of steam locomotives in the said Spanish city in 1893. Football began taking root in the city in the 1890s, and soon it gained followers among workers of the factory, where Hulse was also a teacher for the workers, and since he was a great fan of football himself, he ended up not only training them in the art of assembling hybrid steam engines, but also in football, organizing some games between the workers, and thus becoming one of the pioneers of football not only in Albacete, but in Castilla–La Mancha.

Football team

The owners of Locomotoras Albacete (Goicoechea) and Hulse's boss, the Marquis de Salamanca, encouraged football among workers to distract them from unions and vices. It was a simple sport, easy to learn, cheap, and so physically demanding that it did not leave the workers wanting to party after a match. John Hulse, a great fan of football himself, took the initiative to organize games between the workers, making the crew, after work, get a train to the south of town, where La Primera owned a small piece of land where the first football game of the history of the city would be held in December 1893. John Hulse also took the initiative to properly implement the Sheffield rules. In this way, he gathers workers and foremen in a tavern near the Hightown and explains to them the Sheffield Rules. Finally, in December 1893, Hulse manages to summon enough men to make two teams of six players each: one with workers from Albacete Locomotives, and another with English engineers, the latter consisting of 2 managers, 1 foreman, and 3 loose workers, and thus they were able to play the first known football match in the city. The game was held in the then outskirts of the capital, on land known as La Era La Primera, in reference to the nickname of the very young mother who owned the farm. This match meant the birth of an amateur football club which was named Locomotoras Albacete Balón-Pie, established by John Hulse, who brought the rules of English football according to the Sheffield protocol to the city of Albacete. This team developed its activity by participating in matches and tournaments mainly in the regions of Castilla–La Mancha and Murcia.

The club's first matches to be reported are against recreational groups such as Recreativo de Huelva (1896) and clubs from Murcia (1897), Alcázar de San Juan (1899), and Villarrobledo (1899). However, due to the little statistical rigor that the newspapers had at that time, the exact details of those games are unknown as very little was officially reported about them, of which the most notable was a knock-out stage in 1896 against Recreativo de Huelva, in an unofficial national cup championship, where they lost 2–9 to a very young Huelva side. At the end of the match, the rival captain reportedly asked Albacete's goalkeeper, José María Cardona, if there was something wrong with him. It turns out that neither Cardona, nor apparently anyone in Albacete, knew that the goalkeeper could catch the ball with his hands. Despite this heavy defeat, they still managed to qualify for the final phase of the Alfonso XII Cup as champions of Murcia, having won the 1897 Murcia Cup, which was valid as a classification for the Alfonso XII Cup. The Locomotoras Albacete played the final against Levante Foot-ball Club (not related with Levante UD from Valencia) in the now-defunct Torre de la Marquesa de Murcia, which Murcia won. The line-up or scorers remain unknown. The match was postponed until a referee (or judge, as they were known at the time) was found, and in the end, it was the owner of the field who performed those functions.

In 1899 the politician and businessman Gabriel Lodares, who later became mayor of Albacete, turned his interest in this growing sport and facilitated the acquisition of a field with better conditions closer to the factory that gave rise to the team, the Campo del Paseo de la Cuba.

Notable players
José María Viñas Cardona: He was not from Albacete, but from Mercadal (Menorca). He was the team's goalkeeper. After losing 2–9 to Recreativo de Huelva, the rival captain reportedly asked him if there was something wrong with him. It turns out that neither Cardona, nor apparently anyone in Albacete, knew that the goalkeeper could catch the ball with his hands.

Manganeso: He was a gypsy boy who searched for laborers all over Albacete and ended up playing football with the locomotives. He was very hard-working and extremely serious and did not tolerate jokes or insults in relation to his ethnicity.

Matias Salas Valero "Aberroncho": He played in the first football match in Albacete. He was also the first inhabitant of Albacete to acquire a car. He died in the Spanish Civil War, mistaken for a fascist when he was hunting in Santa Ana.

Benito Calero Morcillo, a painter in Villarrobledo, took the Madrid-Cartagena express, which then stopped in Villarrobledo and Albacete, among many other points, because he had to take two exams in Albacete's secondary schools. In Albacete, however, Benito's wallet was stolen on the train. At noon, Manganeso, who was fixing a locomotive on a siding in the old station, heard him shout to the train inspector that he had no money and nowhere to stay in Albacete, so he intervened and took him to the factory, where they all agreed to give Benito a ticket if he took the night shift, which he accepted. While he was waiting, the morning shift workers invited him to spend the afternoon in the La Primera to play football, and there, Benito surprised everyone as an athlete, and very intelligent one. In the end, Benito did not return to Villarrobledo until 1897. He stayed working on the locomotives for three years, and played a fundamental role in the football team as a coach-player at the Locomotives until the railway company offered him a job as a technician at the Villarrobledo station.

References

Defunct football clubs in Spain
Defunct football clubs in Galicia
1876 establishments in Spain
Association football clubs established in 1876
Sport in Albacete